The justice referendum of 1999 was a Citizens Initiated Referendum held in New Zealand on 27 November 1999, based on the question:
Should there be a reform of our justice system placing greater emphasis on the needs of victims, providing restitution and compensation for them and imposing minimum sentences and hard labour for all serious violent offences?

As a citizens initiated referendum, the results of the vote were non-binding on the New Zealand government. As a result, the changes suggested in the referendum question were not implemented.

Results

References

Justice referendum, 1999
1999 New Zealand justice referendum
1999 referendums
Justice referendum
Justice referendum